Nasa Q'ara (Aymara nasa nose, q'ara bare, bald, also spelled Nazacara) is a  mountain in the Cordillera Real in the Andes of Bolivia. It is situated in the La Paz Department, Los Andes Province, Pucarani Municipality, southwest of the lake Allqa Quta. Nasa Q'ara lies southwest of the main peak of the Kunturiri massif and Wawanaki and southeast of Ch'iyar K'ark'a.

References 

Mountains of La Paz Department (Bolivia)